Brighton Bomb is an Angelic Upstarts album, released in 1987. It is a US re-issue of UK album release Power of the Press (1986), adding the 1985 12" single A-side "Brighton Bomb", and that single's cover art.

Track list
Side A
I Stand Accused
Nottingham Slug
Joe Where Are You Now?
Soldier
Empty Street
Brighton Bomb

Side BPower Of The PressStab In The BackHere I ComeThin Red LineI'd Kill Her For SixpenceGreenfields Of France''

References

1987 albums
Angelic Upstarts albums